The Peace War is a science fiction novel by American writer Vernor Vinge, about authoritarianism and technological progress. It was first published as a serial in Analog in 1984, and in book form shortly afterward. It was nominated for the Hugo Award for Best Novel in 1985. A sequel, Marooned in Realtime, was published in 1986.  The two novels and "The Ungoverned", a related novella, are collected in Across Realtime (Baen Books, 1991).

Plot
The story takes place in 2048, 51 years after scientists at Lawrence Livermore National Laboratory develop a force field generating device they term the Bobbler. The Bobbler creates a perfectly spherical, reflective, impenetrable, and persistent shield around or through anything.

The bureaucracy running the Laboratory decide to use the Bobbler as a weapon. Declaring themselves the "Peace Authority", they enclose the world's weapons and military bases in bobbles, and occasionally entire cities or governments. A brief war is triggered but ends quickly as the military is cut off from command, their weapons, and each other. It is presumed the people within the bobbles die due to a lack of air and sunlight. In this new world, governments are weak where they are permitted at all; the Peace Authority is the true bearer of power and becomes a worldwide government. In an effort to retain their monopoly on the Bobbler, the Peace Authority makes technological progress illegal and returns the planet to a level similar to the 19th century.

The story opens with the crew of a military spaceplane emerging from their bobble and being picked up by a group of Tinkers. The Tinkers are a rebel group who have continued to secretly develop technology to a point well beyond what the Authority allows. Their emergence reveals two previously unknown facts about bobbles; one is that they are not a force field, but a stasis field inside which time stops, and the second is that they do not last forever, but will eventually "pop" at a time depending on their original size. The bobble around the spaceplane popped because it was small, the one covering all of Edwards Air Force Base will presumably last much longer.

One of the original inventors of the bobble helped form the Tinkers. He develops a more advanced version of the bobbler which can produce bobbles of any size, unlike the Authority's original which is at least house-sized and required a huge amount of power to run. Using their new device, they learn that one cannot form a bobble around another. This provides a defence; one can carry a small bobble (in a pocket for instance), making it impossible for the Peace Authority to bobble that person. With the help of a young thief and mathematical genius, they lead a rebellion to try to bobble the power generators of the Peace Authority and thus neutralize its primary weapon.

References

External links 
 
The Peace War at Worlds Without End

American science fiction novels
Transhumanist books
1984 American novels
1984 science fiction novels
Novels by Vernor Vinge
Novels first published in serial form
Works originally published in Analog Science Fiction and Fact